Isaac Roach (February 24, 1786 – December 29, 1848) was an American lawyer and politician who served one term as mayor of Philadelphia, from 1838 to 1839. He was a captain in the United States Army and fought in the War of 1812. He was brevetted to Major in April 1823, and resigned from the army on April 1, 1824. He became the mayor of Philadelphia in 1838 and was later appointed the Treasurer of the Mint.

On October 4, 1819, Roach married Mary Huddell.

Roach died in 1848 in Philadelphia, where he is buried in St. Peter's churchyard.

References

External links

United States Army personnel of the War of 1812
Mayors of Philadelphia
1786 births
1848 deaths
19th-century American politicians
Burials at St. Peter's churchyard, Philadelphia
United States Army officers